Nemba is a settlement in Rwanda.

Location
Nemba is located in Bugesera District, in the Eastern Province of Rwanda, at the border with the Republic of Burundi. The geographical coordinates of this settlement are: 02°21'09.0"S, 30°13'03.0"E (Latitude:-2.352500; Longitude:30.217500).

Population
In 2012, the national population census enumerated the population of Rweru Sector (of which Nemba Cell is a component), at 28,782 people.

Points of interest
The points of interest within the town limits or close to the edges of town include: (a) the offices of Nema Local Council (b) the international border crossing between Rwanda and Burundi (c) Nemba Airport, a small civilian airport, administered by the Rwanda Civil Aviation Authority.

The international border crossing is administered through two "One-Stop-Border-Post" (OSBP) facilities, (one in each country), whereby the customs, immigration and police clearances of both countries are obtained in one location when leaving one country and entering another.

See also
 Nemba Airport
 Bugesera District
 Eastern Province, Rwanda

References

External links
Rwanda: Bugesera to Host U.S.$3 Million Mineral Processing Plant As of 3 December 2011.
Rwanda gets World Bank credit to improve road transport As of 6 June 2017.

Bugesera District
Eastern Province, Rwanda
Populated places in Rwanda
Burundi–Rwanda border crossings